The Derinkuyu underground city (Cappadocian Greek:  Malakopi) is an ancient multi-level underground city in the Derinkuyu district in Nevşehir Province, Turkey, extending to a depth of approximately . It is large enough to have sheltered as many as 20,000 people together with their livestock and food stores. It is the largest excavated underground city in Turkey and is one of several underground complexes found throughout Cappadocia.

Features
The underground city at Derinkuyu could be closed from the inside with large rolling stone doors. Each floor could be closed off separately.

The city could accommodate up to 20,000 people and had amenities found in other underground complexes across Cappadocia, such as wine and oil presses, stables, cellars, storage rooms, refectories, and chapels. Unique to the Derinkuyu complex and located on the second floor is a spacious room with a barrel-vaulted ceiling. It has been reported that this room was used as a religious school and the rooms to the left were studies.

Starting between the third and fourth levels are a series of vertical staircases, which lead to a cruciform church on the lowest (fifth) level.

The large  ventilation shaft appears to have been used as a well. The shaft provided water to both the villagers above and, if the outside world was not accessible, to those in hiding.

History

Caves might have been built initially in the soft volcanic rock of the Cappadocia region by the Phrygians in the 8th–7th centuries BC, according to the Turkish Department of Culture. When the Phrygian language died out in Roman times, replaced with the Greek language, the inhabitants, now Christian, expanded their caverns to deep multiple-level structures adding the chapels and Greek inscriptions.

The city at Derinkuyu was fully formed in the Byzantine era, when it was heavily used as protection from Muslim Arabs during the Arab–Byzantine wars (780–1180 AD). The city was connected with another underground city, Kaymakli, through 8-9 kilometers (about 5 miles) of tunnels. Some artifacts discovered in these underground settlements belong to the Middle Byzantine Period, between the 5th and the 10th centuries.

These cities continued to be used by the Christian natives as protection from the Mongolian incursions of Timur in the 14th century.

After the region fell to the Ottomans, the cities were used as refuges by the natives from the Turkish Muslim rulers.

As late as the 20th century, the local population, Cappadocian Greeks and Armenians, were still using the underground cities to escape periodic persecutions. For example, Richard MacGillivray Dawkins, a Cambridge linguist who conducted research from 1909 to 1911 on the Cappadocian Greek speaking natives in the area, recorded such an event as having occurred in 1909: "When the news came of the recent massacres at Adana, a great part of the population at Axo took refuge in these underground chambers, and for some nights did not venture to sleep above ground."

In 1923, the Christian inhabitants of the region were expelled from Turkey and moved to Greece in the population exchange between Greece and Turkey, whereupon the tunnels were abandoned.

In 1963, the tunnels were rediscovered after a resident of the area found a mysterious room behind a wall in his home while renovating. Further digging revealed access to the tunnel network.

In 1969, the site was opened to visitors, with about half of the underground city currently accessible.

Other underground cities
Nevşehir Province has several other historical underground cities including Kaymaklı Underground City. The underground cities and structures are carved out of unique geological formations. They may have been used as hiding places during times of raids. The locations are now archaeological tourist attractions. They remain generally unoccupied. More than 200 underground cities of at least two levels have been discovered in the area between Kayseri and Nevşehir. Some 40 of those include three or more levels.

See also
 Avanos
 Churches of Göreme, Turkey
 Eskigümüş Monastery
 Ihlara Valley
 Kaymaklı Underground City
 Mokissos
 Nooshabad underground city, Iran
 Özkonak Underground City
 Petra
 Population exchange between Greece and Turkey
 Zelve Monastery

References

Bibliography

External links

Cavetowns and gorges of Cappadocia
 Underground Cities of Cappadocia - Myth and Truth(in German)
 Derinkuyu Underground City
 Derinkuyu & The Underground Cities of Cappadocia Sometimes Interesting. 9 May 2014

Underground cities in Cappadocia
Archaeological sites in Central Anatolia
Christianity in the Byzantine Empire
Buildings and structures in Nevşehir Province
Nevşehir
Tourist attractions in Nevşehir Province